Tadpakal is a village in Yergatla Mandal, Nizamabad district of Telangana in southern India. It sits by the Godavari River.

Pushkaram festival
Tadpakal Pushkaram is part of the Godavari Pushkaram festival that occurs annually all along the Godavari river.

Many people including pilgrims, scholars and political leaders bathe in the river at Tadpakal. Bathers believe that this holy practice will relieve them of sins and restore health.

In 2002 the chief minister of Andhra Pradesh visited Tadpakal and made arrangements for the upcoming festival.

References

 Villages in Nizamabad district

Village; Tadpakal in Yergatla mandal,